is a private junior college in Gamagōri, Aichi, Japan. It has been attached to Aichi University of Technology since 2000.

Departments
 Department of automotive studies

See also 
 List of junior colleges in Japan

External links
  

Japanese junior colleges
Universities and colleges in Aichi Prefecture
Gamagōri, Aichi